Mathias Sele (born 28 May 1992) is a Liechtensteiner footballer who currently plays for FC Schaan.

International career
He was a member of the Liechtenstein national football team, making his debut in a UEFA Euro 2016 qualifying match against Russia on 8 September 2015. Sele also made 14 appearances for the Liechtenstein U21 team between 2011 and 2014.

References

External links

1992 births
Living people
Liechtenstein footballers
USV Eschen/Mauren players
Liechtenstein international footballers
Association football midfielders
FC Balzers players
FC Triesenberg players